Malabar Police is a 1999 Indian Tamil-language crime comedy film directed by P. Vasu. The film stars Sathyaraj, Khushbu, Abbas and Mumtaj. It was released on 6 August 1999, and turned out to be one of the most successful Tamil films of the year.

Plot 

Raja and Julie are lovers and they plan to elope to get married. On the way, they witness the murder of a minister; The murderer Varadappan tries to kill Raja and Julie too as they witnessed the murder; however, they escape and reache Chennai. Chinnasamy is a CBI officer who is appointed to investigate the murder of the minister. He comes to Chennai in search of Raja and Julie, knowing them to the only witnesses for the murder. Meanwhile, Nagarajan and Sivashankar are leading businessmen in Chennai but are business rivals. Chinnasamy sets his eyes on Nagarajan, a close aid of Varadarajan, doubting him to be the murderer of Varadarajan when he is killed in a blast after his arrest. Sivashankar joins hands with Chinnasamy and helps him gather evidence against Nagarajan due to his business rivalry. Meanwhile, Raja and Julie accidentally get separated, and they keep searching for each other. Chinnasamy spots Julie and employs her as a maid in his home. Finally, Chinnasamy solves the case and finds that Sivashankar is the actual murderer. Chinnasamy pretended to doubt Nagarajan, which made him close to Sivashakar, helping him gather evidences. It is revealed that Sivashankar used Varadarajan as a spy employed with Nagarajan to know his business secrets and he was the real murderer. In the end, Raja and Julie are united with the help of Chinnasamy.

Cast 

Sathyaraj as Chinnasamy and Malabar police
Khushbu as Ammukutty
Abbas as Raja
Mumtaj as Julie
Sivakumar as Nagarajan
Goundamani as Govindrajan
Vijayakumar as Inspector General of Tamil Nadu Police
Jai Ganesh as Shivashankar
Anandaraj as Varadappan
Anand as Driver Anand
Indhu as Anand's wife
Vinu Chakravarthy as Meganathan
Mohan V. Ram as Raja's father
Prathapachandran as Inspector General of Kerala Police
Thambi Ramaiah as Perumal
Hemanth Ravan as Police Officer in Chinnasamy's Investing Team
Ravikumar
Laxmi Rattan as Kerala Minister Madhavan Nair
Scissor Manohar
Thalapathi Dinesh
Mahanadi Shankar as a goon
Naga Kannan as martial arts hitman from Kerala

Soundtrack 
The music was composed by S. A. Rajkumar. The song "Hollywood Mudhal" is the debut song of lyricist Na. Muthukumar.

Reception 
Kalki wrote that viewers could enjoy the last 10 minutes if they could endure old fashioned sentiments and lengthy dialogues. Indolink wrote, "What could have turned out to be a taut crime procedural suffers from some unimaginative screenplay and direction by Vasu".

References

External links 

1990s crime comedy films
1990s Tamil-language films
1999 films
Fictional portrayals of the Kerala Police
Fictional portrayals of the Tamil Nadu Police
Films directed by P. Vasu
Films scored by S. A. Rajkumar
Films set in Kerala
Indian crime comedy films